was Japan's first Zen temple, founded in Saga, Kyōto by order of Tachibana no Kachiko during the Jōwa era.  The temple was destroyed by fire in 928, but was restored, and during the Muromachi period the temple was designated as one of Kyōto's five great Buddhist nunneries.  The temple eventually fell into disrepair, and in 1339 construction of Tenryū-ji began on its grounds.

References 
Kōjien, 6th edition
Encyclopedia Nipponica

Buddhist temples in Kyoto
Former buildings and structures in Japan